Phanomorpha lichenopa is a moth in the family Crambidae. It was described by Oswald Bertram Lower in 1897. It is found in Australia, where it has been recorded from New South Wales.

References

Moths described in 1897
Heliothelini